is a train station in the city of Ena, Gifu Prefecture, Japan, operated by the Third-sector railway operator Akechi Railway.

Lines

Station layout
Akechi Station has one ground-level side platform serving a single bi-directional track. The station is staffed.

Adjacent stations

|-
!colspan=5|Akechi Railway

History
The kanji in the station name was changed to its present version on November 16, 1985.

Surrounding area
Taisho-mura
Akechi Elementary School
Akechi Junior High School
Akechi Park Pierluigi Manciniart sculpture
Akechi castle

See also
 List of Railway Stations in Japan

External links

 

Railway stations in Gifu Prefecture
Railway stations in Japan opened in 1934
Stations of Akechi Railway
Ena, Gifu